Vincent James Russo (born January 24, 1961) is an American professional wrestling booker, writer, and pundit.

He is notable for his tenures with the World Wrestling Federation (WWF, now WWE), World Championship Wrestling (WCW) and Total Nonstop Action Wrestling (TNA, now Impact Wrestling) in creative roles. He also occasionally made appearances as an on-screen authority figure, and professional wrestler, in WCW and TNA. His writing style often blurred the lines between reality and fiction, while also favoring elements such as shock twists, grand moments and larger-than-life characters over in-ring action, which made him a controversial figure amongst certain wrestling fans. Russo's time as the head of WWF’s creative department during the widely acclaimed Attitude Era led the company to record high television ratings.

During a self-booked in-ring career in WCW, Russo became a one-time WCW World Heavyweight Champion, and scored televised singles victories over future WWE Hall of Famers Ric Flair and Booker T (the latter to win his world title).

Early life 
Russo grew up in Farmingville, New York and graduated from the University of Southern Indiana (then known as Indiana State University Evansville) in 1983 with a degree in journalism. He worked for the school newspaper The Shield as an assistant sports editor and later as editor-in-chief.

Russo got his start in pro wrestling when he began training under the tutelage of Johnny Rodz at Gleason's Gym in Brooklyn. He owned two video stores on Long Island, New York. Russo also hosted his own local radio show from 1992 to 1993 called Vicious Vincent's World of Wrestling which aired on Sunday nights on WGBB in Freeport, New York. The program ran for exactly one year, the final show being the one-year anniversary.

Professional wrestling career

World Wrestling Federation (1992–1999) 
In 1992, Russo was hired as a freelance writer for WWF Magazine following a letter that he had written to Linda McMahon, and would later become an editor in 1994 under the pseudonym of Vic Venom. He was eventually promoted to the WWF Creative Team in 1996. In that same year, Monday Night Raw hit a ratings low of 1.8, as Monday Nitro (Raws chief competition), was in the midst of an 83-week winning-streak against Raw head-to-head (see Monday Night Wars). With World Championship Wrestling (WCW) eclipsing the WWF, WWF chairman Vince McMahon called upon Russo to make changes to the televised product. Russo contributed edgy, controversial storylines involving sexual content, profanity, swerves or unexpected heel turns, and worked shoots, as well as short matches, backstage vignettes, shocking angles and levels of depicted violence. Russo's style of writing came to be known as "Crash TV" and was heavily inspired by The Jerry Springer Show.

In 1997, Russo became head writer for the WWF and wrote their flagship show Raw Is War as well as their monthly pay-per-views. With the angles that he created, Russo had a large hand in putting WWF ahead of WCW in the Monday night rating wars during the Attitude Era. In an interview with Jeff Lane in 2015, Russo acknowledged that the first thing he wrote as WWF head writer was the episode of Raw that aired on December 15, 1997. At the King of the Ring pay-per-view in 1998, Ed Ferrara joined the WWF creative team and was paired with Russo. Some of the more controversial characters during this time, often cited by critics of Russo, include Sable, Val Venis and The Godfather. Russo devised the infamous Brawl for All tournament. Russo also contributed to the formation of D-Generation X, The Undertaker vs. Kane feud, the Stone Cold Steve Austin vs. Mr. McMahon feud, the rise of The Rock, and Mick Foley's three-face pushes.

In the two years following Russo's promotion to head writer, Raw surpassed WCW's Nitro in head-to-head ratings.

In October 1999, Russo was replaced by Chris Kreski as WWF head writer, after Russo departed the company.

 World Championship Wrestling (1999–2000) 
Hiring and arrival
On October 3, 1999, Russo and Ed Ferrara signed with WCW; Russo contends that his reason for leaving the WWF was the result of a dispute with Vince McMahon over the increased workload caused by the introduction of the new SmackDown! broadcast and McMahon's disregard of Russo's family. Russo and Ferrara attempted to make the same "Crash TV" style on Monday Nitro which was similar to Raw Is War, only at an accelerated pace, including soapier storylines, more lengthy non-wrestling segments, constant heel/face turns, an increased amount of female representation on the show, fake retirements, more backstage vignettes, expanded storyline depth, constant title changes, and the utilization of midcard talent in a more effective manner. Russo and Ferrara often focused on poking fun at the WWF.

Russo's writing style created a large turnover in title changes, reflecting his "crash TV" writing philosophy. His booking of Jushin Thunder Liger losing and regaining the IWGP Junior Heavyweight Championship on Nitro in late 1999 was not recognized by New Japan Pro-Wrestling (NJPW) in the title lineage until 2007; Liger lost the title to Juventud Guerrera, a luchador, after being hit over the head with a tequila bottle. Swerves and scenarios treated as "shoots" were heavily emphasized, as wrestlers supposedly gave unscripted interviews using "insider" terms that were only recognized by the Internet smarks; chaotic broadcasts became the norm.

 Walk out and return 
In January 2000, Russo received two phone calls, one from Bret Hart (then WCW World Heavyweight Champion) and another from Jeff Jarrett (then WCW United States Heavyweight Champion), both saying that they were injured, thus could not wrestle and forced to vacate their respective championships. This required Russo to alter the plans he had in mind for Hart and the New World Order. Russo and his booking committee sat down to determine what would now happen at Souled Out. One of the ideas included putting the now-vacated WCW Title on the shoot fighter Tank Abbott, a former UFC fighter. In an attempt to do something believable, the idea was originally to have a "rumble match" in which Sid Vicious would be an early entrant in the match and would last all the way to the end when Abbott would come into the match and eliminate him with one punch. Russo said that Abbott might not have held the belt for more than 24 hours if this title change had actually occurred. However, the day after he and his committee came up with the idea, he was asked to work in a committee and no longer be head writer. Russo declined the offer and left the company, with his immediate replacement being Kevin Sullivan, who along with other bookers, chose wrestler Chris Benoit to win the title from Vicious in a singles bout with Arn Anderson as the referee.

Three months after Russo's departure, Kevin Sullivan was ultimately relieved of his duties in March 2000 and Russo returned as lead writer, alongside the returning Eric Bischoff. The idea was that Russo and Bischoff would reboot WCW into a more modern, streamlined company that would allow the younger talent to work with the established stars. On April 10, 2000, WCW Monday Nitro edition, Vince Russo was introduced as an on-screen antagonist authority figure. Notable storyline points his character was involved with include "The New Blood vs. The Millionaire's Club"; his feud with Ric Flair where he and David Flair were involved with shaving Ric Flair's hair as well as Reid Flair's hair; his feud with Goldberg; and his short reign as world champion. On May 8, 2000, Russo booked Miss Elizabeth in her first official wrestling match against Daffney. Elizabeth left the company shortly thereafter.

 Bash at the Beach 2000 incident 
At Bash at the Beach 2000, Russo was involved in an incident with Hulk Hogan where Hogan was booked to lose a match against reigning WCW World Heavyweight Champion Jeff Jarrett. Hogan refused to lose the match (invoking his contract's "creative control" clause to override Russo), due to Russo's apparent lack of direction for Hogan's character following the planned loss. In the end, Russo booked Jarrett to literally lie down for Hogan, which resulted in Hogan doing a worked shoot on Russo saying, "That's why this company is in the damn shape it's in; because of bullshit like this" and scoring the pinfall victory by placing his foot on Jarrett's chest. Russo would come out later in the broadcast to nullify the match's result, as he publicly fired Hogan. This action restored the title to Jarrett, which set up a new title match between Jarrett and Booker T, with the latter winning the match and the title.
As Russo promised, Hogan never resurfaced in WCW and even filed a lawsuit against Russo for defamation of character (which was dismissed in 2003 stating that the charges filed against Russo were "groundless" and "were just part of a wrestling storyline"). Hogan claims (in his autobiography, Hollywood Hulk Hogan) that Russo turned the angle into a shoot, and that he was double-crossed by Turner executive Brad Siegel who did not want to use him anymore due to his costs per appearance. Eric Bischoff states in his autobiography, Controversy Creates Ca$h, that Hogan winning and leaving with the title was a work which would result in his return several months later where the plan was to crown a new champion at Halloween Havoc, where Hogan would come out at the end of the show and ultimately win a champion vs. champion match – but Russo coming out to fire him was in fact a shoot which led to the lawsuit filed by Hogan.  Bischoff claims that he and Hogan celebrated after the event over the angle, but were distraught to get a phone call hearing of Russo's in-ring shoot after Hogan left the arena. Mike Awesome, cousin to Hogan's nephew Horace Hogan (who also left the company following the incident) also alleged in a shoot interview published by Highspots that the disputes and the incident also affected his WCW run, in which Russo allegedly took out his problems with Hulk Hogan on Awesome, citing that he was "too close of kin" to Hogan, by portraying several poorly received gimmicks.

World Heavyweight Champion, injury, and departure
In mid-2000, Russo entered into an angle with Ric Flair. The angle notably included Russo sending cops to the ring to arrest Flair during the wedding between Stacy Keibler and Flair's son David.
In August 2000 at New Blood Rising, Russo entered into a feud with Goldberg after confronting Goldberg when the wrestler left a match and "refused to follow the script." The next PPV, Fall Brawl, saw Russo interfere in Goldberg’s match against Scott Steiner, costing Goldberg the match.

On the September 18, 2000 episode of Nitro, Russo was in a tag match alongside Sting and Booker T versus Scott Steiner and Jeff Jarret, with the wrestler getting the pin receiving a shot at Booker T's WCW World Heavyweight Championship. Russo won after Booker T dragged an unconscious Russo onto Steiner for the three count. The following week, Russo faced Booker T in a steel cage match for the WCW World Heavyweight Championship. The match did not appear to have a clear winner as Russo was speared by Goldberg through the side of the cage at the same time Booker exited the cage. Two days later on WCW Thunder, Russo was announced as the winner and new champion.Thunder - Wednesday, September 27, 2000 However, the reign was short lived as Russo announced he was vacating the title immediately after, as he was not a wrestler. Russo suffered a severe concussion from the spear spot, and took time off because of post-concussion syndrome.leave of absence

Russo's run as head writer and fledgling in-ring career came to a halt after the concussion and other injuries. Time Warner bought out Russo's contract shortly after the WCW buyout in May 2001.

 Return to WWE (2002) 
Russo later returned to WWE in June 2002 as a consultant to oversee creative direction of both Raw and SmackDown!, but quickly left after two weeks, after stating that there was "no way in the world that this thing would work out". The major storyline idea he proposed was an entire restart of the WCW Invasion, featuring previously unsigned talent such as Bill Goldberg, Scott Steiner, Eric Bischoff and Bret Hart. After feeling disrespected by a phone call with Stephanie McMahon, Russo then left of his own accord (turning down a $125,000 per year stay-at-home 'advisory' role with WWE in favor of a $100,000 per year full-time position with TNA).

 Total Nonstop Action Wrestling (2002–2014) 

 Writing and on-screen character  

In July 2002, Russo joined Jeff and Jerry Jarrett's NWA-TNA promotion as a creative writer and would assist in the writing and production of the shows. Russo claims that the name "Total Nonstop Action" came from him and that the original concept was, as they were exclusive to pay-per-view, to be an edgier product than WWE; the initials of the company "TNA" being a play on "T&A," short for "Tits and Ass." Throughout the first few years, there were numerous reports of a creative power struggle over the direction of the programming. 

During the time when these rumors circulated, Russo eventually debuted as an on-screen character when the mysterious masked wrestler "Mr. Wrestling III" helped Jeff Jarrett win the NWA World Heavyweight Championship and was eventually unveiled as him. In the on-screen story, Jarrett did not want Russo's help which led to the two become involved in a feud. Russo created his own faction of wrestlers he dubbed Sports Entertainment Xtreme (S.E.X.), recruiting the likes of Glenn Gilbertti, Sonny Siaki, B.G. James, Raven, Trinity, and others. S.E.X. faced the more traditional TNA wrestlers led by Jeff Jarrett. Eventually, Russo would leave his on-screen role and Gilbertti would become the leader of S.E.X. instead.

After leaving for a brief period, Russo returned as an on-screen character on the May 28, 2003 pay-per-view where he would hit Raven with a baseball bat helping Gilbertti become the number one contender for the world championship. The next week on June 4, 2003, when Gilbertti fought Jarrett for the world championship, Russo would hit Gilbertti with a baseball bat which in turn helped Jarrett retain his belt. On the following week's pay-per-view (June 11, 2003), when A.J. Styles and Raven fought Jarrett for the world title in a triple threat match, Russo teased hitting Styles with Jarrett's trademark guitar, but eventually hit Jarrett leading Styles to win the world championship belt.

Russo would then manage NWA World Heavyweight Champion A.J. Styles for the remainder of his 2003 run and S.E.X. was quietly written out of the storylines. On October 1, 2003, Russo suffered the first loss of his in-ring career in a tag team match against Dusty Rhodes and Jeff Jarrett, although his partner, Styles, yielded the pin.  On the October 15, 2003 pay-per-view, Russo made his final appearance of that year in a street-fight with Jarrett. It was reported that Russo was written out of the company as a result of Hulk Hogan's signing and because Hogan reportedly said that he would not work for TNA as long as Russo was involved with the company. In February 2004, shortly after Hogan was not able to commit with TNA, Russo would eventually return but strictly as an on-air character, becoming the "Director of Authority" in the storylines. This time, he was a face, claiming to have changed his ways (which was likely inspired by Russo's real-life conversion to Christianity). However, he would disappear again in late 2004 when Dusty Rhodes was "voted" the new D.O.A. over himself at the three-hour November 2004 pay-per-view Victory Road in an interactive "election" on TNA's website. Russo left the company after the 2004 Victory Road pay-per-view. In a November 2005 interview, Russo states that he never wrote a single show on his own during this period at TNA and described his time there as a "total nightmare."

 Return as a creative writer 
On September 21, 2006, TNA president Dixie Carter re-signed Russo as a writer on the TNA creative team. Russo was paired with Dutch Mantell and Jeff Jarrett on the TNA creative team.

During the March 2007 TNA pay-per-view Destination X on the "Last Rites" match with Abyss and Sting, "Fire Russo!" chants erupted from the crowd in the arena at Orlando indicating the fans' frustration with the incidents that occurred during the match.

Another time the "Fire Russo!" chants were heard was at the following month's pay-per-view Lockdown that was held in St. Louis on April 15, 2007. The chants were heard during the electrified steel cage match with Team 3D and The LAX where the lights would flicker on-and-off whenever a wrestler touched the cage giving the impression of electrocution. Dixie Carter has since noted that gimmick was created by writer Dutch Mantell. However, in a 2011 interview, Mantell denied this and the two proceeded to argue over Twitter for several months after this.

Russo became head of creative for TNA sometime during July 2009. On addressing the "Fire Russo!" chants, Russo said he was not head of creative during that time, and when the idea of the electrified steel cage was presented to him, he said that there was no way that the concept could have been done in a believable manner and that he was often blamed for ideas that he never even came up with. At the September 2009 No Surrender pay-per-view, Ed Ferrara joined TNA and began working on the creative team with Vince Russo and junior contributor Matt Conway.

On October 27, 2009, Hulk Hogan and Eric Bischoff signed with TNA and were paired with Russo, whom they had conflicted with in WCW and had not worked with since they departed the company after Bash at the Beach 2000. In 2010, when asked about his relationship with Russo at TNA, Hogan said he came to TNA in peace, that the writing staff of Russo, Ed Ferrara, Matt Conway, and Jeremy Borash have really "stepped it up", and that Hogan loved Russo "from a distance". According to Russo, the three met together and worked out their differences. While working with Russo, Bischoff also stated in a February 2010 interview that it was a "very positive experience" and that their collaborations were productive.

By October 6, 2011, Russo had stepped down to the role of a contributing writer, with Bruce Prichard taking over the head writer's role. On February 14, 2012, TNA president Dixie Carter explained that TNA and Russo had mutually parted ways during the week.

 Secret return 
In April 2014, the PWInsider website claimed that Russo was working as a consultant for TNA Wrestling. Russo denied the reports, but on July 15, PWInsider reported that Russo had accidentally sent an email to them with instructions on how TNA's commentators work. As a result, and after trying to state that he was not involved with TNA, Russo admitted on his website that he was already working as a consultant for TNA Wrestling to work with TNA's commentators and that one of TNA's conditions was that Russo was to keep his involvement confidential. In less than two days, Russo's statement was removed from his website.

On July 30, 2014, Russo claimed that he was "officially done" with TNA. Not long after, Russo revealed that he had been working for TNA since October 24, 2013, claiming that he had been involved in creative meetings and also critiqued the weekly episodes of Impact Wrestling. Russo stated that he was getting paid about $3,000 a month, averaging to $36,000 a year, to be a consultant with TNA.

 Aro Lucha (2017–2018) 
On December 8, 2017, Russo signed with the Nashville, Tennessee-based Aro Lucha promotion as a script consultant. On April 5, 2018, Aro Lucha's CEO, Jason Brown, explained via a question and answer session on WeFunder (a crowd-funding website), that Russo had been hired as an independent contractor, not as an employee. As of April 2018, Russo is no longer with the promotion.

 Legacy in wrestling
Russo is among the most controversial figures in wrestling. He often states that the story and character elements of the show are what draws viewers, and thus emphasizes entertainment over the in-ring aspect of professional wrestling. Newsday writes that "Despite scripting some of the most successful WWF television programs in history, and later doing the same for WCW and TNA, Russo remains one of wrestling's most reviled personalities for his sometimes unconventional take on the wrestling business." According to Russo, one reason he is reviled is due to his take on the current WWE product; he believes there is too much actual wrestling and not enough storylines. In Russo's book, Rope Opera, he writes that he has been conversely referred to as "the saviour of the WWF" and "the man who destroyed WCW".

WWE credits Russo with being responsible for many of the Attitude Era's storylines. Likewise, Bob Kapur of Slam! Wrestling gives Russo credit for the company turning away from the cartoonish style of the early 1990s and instead bringing more mature storylines and characters to the promotion.

Gene Okerlund claimed in 2004 that Russo's ideas were successful in the WWF because Vince McMahon was able to control them, while Ric Flair doubted Russo's WWF influence during their time together in WCW, later blaming Russo for the disorganization of WCW. Eric Bischoff has said that Russo was hired at WCW by overstating his influence in WWF, which Bischoff called "fraudulent." Wrestling promoters Tony Khan and Jody Hamilton have criticized Russo's role in the downfall of WCW, and TNA co-founder Jerry Jarrett expressed regret at the decision of bringing Russo in. 

Russo's decision to have David Arquette win the WCW World Heavyweight Championship was viewed as highly controversial; though Russo defended his decision, citing that mainstream American newspapers covered the story. WrestleCrap named Arquette the worst wrestling champion of all time and called Russo's decision a "monumentally damaging blow to a company that was already at death's door." WWE's Rise and Fall of WCW documentary also largely blamed Russo for the decline of WCW, prompting DVD Talk critic Nick Hartel to write that "while Russo deserves a lot of blame, he was not the only one in charge." R. D. Reynolds was also critical of many of Russo's booking decisions but stated that Turner Broadcasting executive Jamie Kellner's decision to cancel WCW programs from Turner Networks was ultimately responsible for WCW's death. Regarding his time in WCW, Russo personally said, "WCW and I were never on the same page; it was just that simple".

Former TNA President Dixie Carter praised Russo as "incredibly talented" in 2014, but admitted his presence "proved to be too distracting to continue a working relationship"; when asked if Russo could return to the promotion she said "never say never". Various wrestlers who worked with Russo in TNA have spoken fondly of him, including: Hernandez, Kurt Angle, and AJ Styles. Velvet Sky and Angelina Love credit Russo for being supportive of TNA's Knockouts division.

 Online work 
In 2014, Russo wrote a series of columns for What Culture, a UK-based website with a dedicated pro wrestling section. Russo began hosting a daily podcast  Vince Russo's The Brand for The RELM Network on April 20, 2015. In July 2016, Russo hosted a Fightful Wrestling podcast but left prematurely in November 2016 due to his heart no longer being interested in the current wrestling product. He now writes a weekly column for Chris Jericho's website WebIsJericho.com.

 Books 
Russo is also an author. He has written Forgiven: One Man's Journey from Self-Glorification to Sanctification, his autobiography (released on November 29, 2005) documenting his early life, his WWF run, as well as his Christian faith. The book was written in 2000, originally titled Welcome To Bizarroland and was a book that negatively portrayed people in the wrestling business. After being a born again Christian, the title and content of the book was revised to correspond with his newly found faith.

Russo's second book Rope Opera: How WCW Killed Vince Russo was released on March 1, 2010 and chronicles his tenure with WCW and TNA. The title Rope Opera stems from the title of a television series idea that he pitched to networks at the time of his WWF tenure.

 Personal life 
Russo is an American of Italian descent, as his maternal grandfather was Sicilian. He has been married to his wife Amy since 1983. The couple have three children together. In October 2003, Russo became a Born Again Christian. In 2004, he formed a short-lived online Christian ministry titled Forgiven. In late 2005, he produced two shows for his Christian Ring of Glory independent promotion.

Russo was close friends with Joanie Laurer, professionally known as Chyna.

Conflicts with Jim Cornette
Russo worked with Jim Cornette in the WWF during the 1990s and in TNA during the 2000s. They regularly conflicted over their opposing views on the wrestling business. In April 2010, a law firm contacted and accused Cornette of making a "terroristic threat" after writing a letter saying, "I want Vince Russo to die. If I could figure out a way to murder him without going to prison, I would consider it the greatest accomplishment of my life." In June 2017, Russo filed a restraining order against Cornette after repeated verbal threats of physical harm towards Russo and his family. Their rivalry has been featured in Dark Side of the Ring episodes covering the Montreal Screwjob and WWF's Brawl for All, which aired in 2019 and 2020 respectively.

 Championships and accomplishments 
 World Championship Wrestling WCW World Heavyweight Championship (1 time)
 Wrestling Observer Newsletter'''''
 Worst Gimmick (1999) 
Worst On Interviews (2000)
Worst Non-Wrestling Personality (2000)

References

External links 

 WWE: Inside WWE > Title History > WCW World Championship > 20000925 - Vince Russo
 

1961 births
Living people
American Christians
American magazine writers
American male professional wrestlers
American podcasters
American professional wrestlers of Italian descent
American television writers
American male television writers
Professional wrestlers from New York (state)
Professional wrestling authority figures
Professional wrestling managers and valets
Professional wrestling podcasters
Professional wrestling writers 
People from Farmingville, New York
University of Southern Indiana alumni
WCW World Heavyweight Champions
World Championship Wrestling executives
Writers from New York City
Screenwriters from New York (state)
Professional wrestlers from New York City